Scaphyglottis sickii is a species of orchid occurring from Grenada to tropical South America.

References

External links 

sickii
Flora of Grenada
Plants described in 1956